Răzoarele may refer to several villages in Romania:

 Răzoarele, a village in Ileana Commune, Călărași County
 Răzoarele, a village in Oltina Commune, Constanța County